MHO or mho may refer to:

 Mho, a former name for the siemens (unit)
 Metabolically healthy obesity (MHO)
 Mashi language (ISO 639-3 language code mho)